Iaeger (pronounced YAY-ger) is a town in McDowell County, West Virginia, United States. The population was 257 at the 2020 census.

History
Iaeger was incorporated in 1917 and named for Colonel William G. W. Iaeger, an early settler.

Geography

A junction of the Norfolk Southern Railway is located in Iaeger.

It is the westernmost town in McDowell County.

Climate
The climate in this area is characterized by hot, humid summers and generally mild to cool winters.  According to the Köppen Climate Classification system, Iaeger has a humid subtropical climate, abbreviated "Cfa" on climate maps.

Demographics

2010 census
As of the census of 2010, there were 302 people, 131 households, and 83 families living in the town. The racial makeup of the town was 98.3% White, 1.3% African American, and 0.3% from two or more races.

There were 131 households, of which 28.2% had children under the age of 18 living with them, 49.6% were married couples living together, 9.9% had a female householder with no husband present, 3.8% had a male householder with no wife present, and 36.6% were non-families. 32.1% of all households were made up of individuals, and 21.4% had someone living alone who was 65 years of age or older. The average household size was 2.31 and the average family size was 2.88.

The median age in the town was 45.3 years. 18.2% of residents were under the age of 18; 9.4% were between the ages of 18 and 24; 21.8% were from 25 to 44; 29.5% were from 45 to 64; and 21.2% were 65 years of age or older. The gender makeup of the town was 48.0% male and 52.0% female.

2000 census
As of the census of 2000, there were 358 people, 167 households, and 106 families living in the town. The racial makeup of the town was 96.37% White, 2.51% African American, and 1.12% from two or more races. Hispanic or Latino of any race were 0.56% of the population.

There were 167 households, out of which 21.6% had children under the age of 18 living with them, 51.5% were married couples living together, 10.8% had a female householder with no husband present, and 36.5% were non-families. 34.7% of all households were made up of individuals, and 19.2% had someone living alone who was 65 years of age or older. The average household size was 2.14 and the average family size was 2.75.

In the town, the population was spread out, with 17.9% under the age of 18, 6.1% from 18 to 24, 27.9% from 25 to 44, 29.6% from 45 to 64, and 18.4% who were 65 years of age or older. The median age was 44 years. For every 100 females, there were 79.0 males. For every 100 females age 18 and over, there were 83.8 males.

The median income for a household in the town was $14,886, and the median income for a family was $21,250. Males had a median income of $23,750 versus $35,000 for females. The per capita income for the town was $17,263. About 29.0% of families and 32.8% of the population were below the poverty line, including 30.0% of those under age 18 and 29.3% of those age 65 or over.

References

Towns in McDowell County, West Virginia
Towns in West Virginia
Coal towns in West Virginia